Christian McBride's New Jawn is a studio album by American jazz bassist Christian McBride recorded together with saxophonist Marcus Strickland, trumpeter Josh Evans, and drummer Nasheet Waits. The album was released on October 26, 2018 via Mack Avenue label. Eight of the 9 songs included in the album are originals written by bandmembers; one composition is written by Wayne Shorter.

Reception

Maureen Malloy of WRTI stated "For those who don’t know, 'jawn' is Philly slang for a person, place or thing... The sound is unique due to the absence of a pianist, which makes it even more like Philly – gritty and daring, and maybe a bit brash". Hillary Brown of DownBeat commented "No doubt, the Philly flavor is present—tight instrumentation, fast-and-loose percussive subtlety and soul for days... A proper captain, McBride always brings the swing full-circle..." A reviewer of Bass Player added "Call something a "jawn" in Philly, and everyone will know that whatever you're talking about has a certain hip cachet, a heavy dose of soul, and a generous helping of what in the City of Brotherly Love is known as "atty-tood." Christian McBride's New Jawn has all of that and more!" JazzTimes's Dan Bilawsky commented "What starts out looking like a complete departure of form for this bassist of note turns out to be something else entirely: the continuation of one man’s grand creative journey and a ready acknowledgement of possibility in motion."

Track listing

Personnel 
Christian McBride – bass, producer
Josh Evans – trumpet
Marcus Strickland – tenor sax, bass clarinet
Nasheet Waits – drums
Todd Whitelock – associate producer

Chart performance

References

External links
 Christian McBride Discography 

2018 albums
Christian McBride albums
Mack Avenue Records albums